Blaž Cof (born 5 July 1991) is a Slovenian male canoeist who won a world championship in C1 at individual senior level at the Wildwater Canoeing World Championships.

References

External links
 

1991 births
Living people
Slovenian male canoeists
Place of birth missing (living people)